Yann Capet (born 31 December 1975) is a French politician for the Socialist Party, who served as a member of the National Assembly between 2012 and 2017, representing the Pas-de-Calais's 7th constituency.

References

External links 

 

1975 births
Living people
University of Lille Nord de France alumni
People from Calais
People from Pas-de-Calais
Socialist Party (France) politicians
Politicians from Hauts-de-France
Deputies of the 14th National Assembly of the French Fifth Republic
Members of Parliament for Pas-de-Calais

21st-century French politicians